The Mandatory Palestine national football team, also known as the Eretz Israel national football team, represented the British Mandate of Palestine in international football competitions, and was managed by the Palestine Football Association.

The team was founded in 1928 by Yosef Yekutieli, leader of the Jewish sports organisation Maccabi World Union, under the newly formed "Palestine Football Association", so-named in order to qualify for membership of FIFA (which required teams to be representative of the population of their country). It achieved FIFA membership in 1929, despite in practice being an almost exclusively Jewish organisation at a time when Jews represented a small minority of the country's population. In 1934 all Arabs involved in the organisation left, as they considered they were being used as a "fig leaf".

The team used to play in the Maccabiah Stadium, Maccabi Ground and Palms Ground, all three located in Tel Aviv. Mandatory Palestine played five official games (four FIFA World Cup qualifiers, and one friendly), before it officially became the national team of Israel in 1948.

History 

Football was introduced to Palestine by the British military during its occupation of the territory in World War I. After the war, the sport's development was continued by "European Jews who had been exposed to soccer in their native countries". The Palestine Football Association was founded in August 1928 and applied for membership in FIFA. It was accepted to FIFA on 6 June 1929 as the Palestine Football Association, following an application by the Jewish Maccabi World Union. It was the first of 14 sports organisations which absorbed hundreds of leading sportsmen who immigrated in the wake of antisemitism in Europe.

By FIFA rules, the association had to represent all of Palestine's population, and it made formal claims to that effect. In practice, it was dominated by Jewish players and executives, despite Palestinian Arabs forming the majority of the population.

According to Issam Khalidi, "the Jewish leadership" of the association systematically limited Arab participation by ensuring Jewish clubs constituted its majority, imposing Hebrew for official communication, and adding the Zionist flag in its logo. Consequently, the Palestinian Arab players boycotted the national team and, in 1934, the Arab clubs left the association to form the General Palestinian Sports Association.

Mandatory Palestine played five international games before the end of the British Mandate in 1948 which resulted in Israel's independence. During those five games, the national team fielded only Jewish players. Three anthems were played before each match: the British "God Save the King", the Jewish (and future Israeli) "Hatikvah" and the opposing team's anthem.

In 1948 the team officially became the national team of Israel.

Players

1934 FIFA World Cup qualification 
Coaches:  Egon Pollak and  Shimon Ratner

1938 FIFA World Cup qualification 
Coach:  Egon Pollak

1940 friendly 
Coach:  Arthur Baar

FIFA World Cup record

Results

See also 

Football in Israel
History of the Israel national football team
Israel national football team
Palestine national football team

Notes

References

Bibliography 
 

Former national association football teams in Asia
Football in Mandatory Palestine
Israel national football team
Organizations based in Mandatory Palestine
1928 establishments in Mandatory Palestine
National sports teams established in 1928